Space radio station (short: space station) is a radio station located on an object travelling beyond the major portion of the Earth's atmosphere. Each station shall be classified by the service in which it operates permanently or temporarily. However, most spacecraft communicate by this means.

See also
Earth exploration-satellite service
Earth station

References / sources 

 International Telecommunication Union (ITU)

Radio stations and systems ITU